The scallop-breasted antpitta (Grallaricula loricata) is a species of bird in the family Grallariidae. It is endemic to the Venezuelan Coastal Range.

Its natural habitat is subtropical or tropical moist montane forest. It is threatened by habitat loss.

References

External links
Scallop-breasted Antpitta photo gallery VIREO
Photo; Article birdtours.co.uk

Scallop-breasted Antpitta
Birds of the Venezuelan Coastal Range
Endemic birds of Venezuela
Scallop-breasted Antpitta
Scallop-breasted antpitta
Taxonomy articles created by Polbot